Clint Williams (born May 16, 1977) is a retired Grenadian athlete who specialized in 400 metres, he represented Grenada as part of its first Olympic 4 × 400m Relay team which was disqualified at the 1996 Summer Olympics.

Competition record

References

External links
 

1977 births
Living people
Grenadian male sprinters
Olympic athletes of Grenada
Athletes (track and field) at the 1996 Summer Olympics